Zisa may refer to:

 Zisa (goddess), a goddess in Germanic paganism
 Zisa, Palermo, a castle in Italy
 Zisa Corona, corona on Venus

People with the surname
 Alberto Zisa
 Alessandro Zisa (born 1965), Italian curler
 Ken Zisa, American politician

See also
 Cisa (disambiguation)